The 1946–47 Toronto Maple Leafs season involved winning the Stanley Cup. During the season, Maple Leaf Gardens was the first arena in the NHL to have Plexiglas inserted in the end zones of the rink.

Off-season
Frank Selke was involved in the wrong end of a power struggle with Conn Smythe and the club's board of directors. Selke was let go, and was immediately signed as the new general manager of the Montreal Canadiens. Frank McCool retired of his own volition due to his ulcers, while Lorne Carr, Dave Schriner, Mel Hill and Bob Davidson were asked to retire by the team. Babe Pratt was traded to Boston. The team brought in several rookies: Bill Barilko, Garth Boesch, Howie Meeker and Sid Smith.

Regular season
Despite having a large number of rookies, the team won twenty of their first thirty-one games, led by the play of Meeker. Meeker set a rookie record, scoring five goals in a 10–4 win over Chicago on January 8, 1947. The team bounced back from a disappointing 1945–46 season to place second and qualify for the playoffs.

Final standings

Record vs. opponents

Schedule and results

Playoffs

Stanley Cup Finals

Montreal Canadiens vs. Toronto Maple Leafs

Toronto wins best-of-seven series 4–2.

Player statistics

Regular season
Scoring

Goaltending

Playoffs
Scoring

Goaltending

Awards and records

Transactions
 April 13, 1946: Signed Free Agent Howie Meeker
 April 30, 1946: Signed Free Agent Tod Sloan
 May 1, 1946: Signed Free Agent Harry Taylor
 June 1, 1946: Claimed Ray Powell from the Fort Worth Rangers of the USHL in Inter-League Draft
 September 21, 1946: Acquired Gerry Brown from the Detroit Red Wings for Doug Baldwin and Ray Powell
 September 21, 1946: Acquired Dutch Hiller and Vic Lynn from the Montreal Canadiens for Gerry Brown and John Mahaffy
 December 8, 1946: Signed Free Agent Sid Smith
 December 31, 1946: Traded Ross Johnstone to the Springfield Indians of the AHL for cash

See also
 1946–47 NHL season

References
 
Notes

External links
 Maple Leafs on Hockey Database
 Maple Leafs on Database Hockey

Stanley Cup championship seasons
Toronto Maple Leafs seasons
Toronto
Tor